Edward Julius (25 September 1873  – 9 August 1951) was Conservator of Forests for South Australia 1924–1935.

History

Julius was born in Sydney, son of William Warner Julius, millowner and canegrower of Cudgen, New South Wales, and Sarah Jane Julius, who emigrated from Dromore, County Tyrone, around 1875. He was educated at Newington College.

He started with the forestry service around 1908.
He was a forest guard at Warialda, New South Wales for the NSW Forestry Service in 1912, and at Narrabri in 1913.
He was promoted to Forest Assessor, Armidale in 1917, then Acting Assistant Forester, Narrabri, in the same year, made permanent in 1918.
He moved to Orange in 1920.

In July 1921 he was appointed Forester in charge of the North-Western District of Tasmania, based in Burnie.

In October 1923 he won an appointment as Conservator of Forests in South Australia, succeeding Walter Gill. The appointment was controversial, having been made by the Government against the recommendation of the Public Service Board, and also criticised by H. H. Corbin for having no knowledge of silviculture, or of South Australian conditions, when there were many Adelaide graduates of the University's School of Forestry better qualified.

He retired in 1935 and joined the staff of Sapfor. His replacement was C. J. Rodgers BSc, a graduate of the University of Adelaide.

Julius, with J. S. Barnes and Charles H. Homes, general manager of Sapfor, developed and patented a technique for speedier kiln-drying of Pinus insignis (or radiata) timber. The patent rights were assigned to Homes.

Family
Julius married Mary Louisa "Minnie" Clarke (died 24 June 1951) on 23 May 1900. They had one son
Charles Julius (15 April 1910 – 29 November 1965) was educated at St Peter's College, Adelaide, and Sydney University, studied anthropology, won the Frank Albert Prize for 1935, graduated MA 1937. He was government anthropologist for PNG, studied kuru.

While in Adelaide they had a home at Marlborough Street, College Park, then in 1930 moved to Wellington Flats, North Adelaide, and in 1931 to Pier Street, Glenelg.
Their last home was at 180 Ocean Street, Edgecliff, New South Wales.

Mr. F. H. Julius, of Cudgen and W. J. Julius of North Richmond, Hawkesbury River, were his brothers.

Notes and references 

1873 births
1951 deaths
Australian foresters